Stanely was a railway station to the west of Paisley, Renfrewshire, Scotland.

History 
The station was originally part of the Paisley and Barrhead District Railway. The line was opened in 1897 and used for freight until the 1960s but none of the stations including this one opened for passenger travel. It was located directly to the south (toward the Gleniffer braes) of the castle in Stanely Dam. The line ran along the edge of the dam to Glenfield. The platform was the same long concrete island design as the other Paisley and Barrhead District Railway stations.

References

Notes

Sources 
 Wham, Alisdair (2000). Lost Railway Lines South of Glasgow. Wigtown: GC Book Publishers Ltd. .

External links 

 Dedicated web page

Disused railway stations in Renfrewshire
Unbuilt railway stations in the United Kingdom
Buildings and structures in Paisley, Renfrewshire
Transport in Paisley, Renfrewshire